Ahala may refer to:

 Gaius Servilius Structus Ahala, Roman consul in 478 BC
 Gaius Servilius Ahala ( 439 BC), Roman politician and assassin
 Gaius Servilius Ahala (consular tribune 408 BC)
 Quintus Servilius Ahala, Roman consul in 365, 362 and 342 BC